The Wiener Flötenuhr or Viennese Musical Clock is a prize given by the Mozart Society of Vienna (German: Mozartgemeinde Wien) for notable recordings of works by Mozart.

History
The Musical Clock was designed by the sculptor Fritz Tiefenthaler for the first award ceremony in 1969. It is a relief gilt iron plate with a historical music box. The left side reads "Schallplattenpreis Flötenuhr", or "Record prize Musical clock", and the right reads "Mozartgemeinde Wien", or "Mozart Society of Vienna". It was originally presented annually, but for several years has only been presented every second year. The suggestion for the design was made by the then honorary chairman of the Mozart Society, inspired by Mozart's late compositions for music boxes and mechanical organs (for example, K. 594 and 608). Until 1982, the record company was awarded a replica of the Viennese Musical Clock, while the artist was given a certificate on which was shown the Leipzig musical clock, which was the model for the Viennese version. Since the late 1980s, the tradition of awarding a replica of the clock has been dispensed with for financial reasons. From the 1990s, the artists have been rewarded directly. As part of a long-standing tradition, each prize is presented in a 'winner's concert'. Today, the original Viennese musical clock, along with the archives of the Mozart Society, reside in the Vienna City and State archives.

Recipients of the Wiener Flötenuhr

1970s and 1980s
Source:

 Vienna Philharmonic
 Camerata Salzburg
 Dresdner Staatskapelle
 Academy of St Martin in the Fields
 London Philharmonic Orchestra
 Nikolaus Harnoncourt
 Czech Philharmonic
 Pavel Štěpán
 Karl Böhm
 Jana Jonášová
 Neville Marriner
 Bernhard Klee
 Edda Moser
 Peter Schreier
 Maurizio Pollini
 Jörg Demus
 Amadeus Quartet
 Polish Chamber Orchestra
 Alban Berg Quartett
 Küchl Quartett

1989–present, new format
Source:

 András Schiff, 1989
 Roland Batik and the Artis-Quartett, 1991
 Thomas Zehetmair, 1992
 Ensemble Wien, 1993
 Wolfgang Schulz and Hansjörg Schellenberger, 1995
 Alban Berg Quartet, 1996
 Ruth Ziesak, 1997
 Bo Skovhus, 1998
 Margarethe Babinsky, 1999
 Anton Scharinger, 2001
 Edith Lienbacher, 2003
 Barbara Moser / Joanna Madroszkiewicz, 2005
 Haydn Trio Eisenstadt, 2007
 Bertrand de Billy, 2009
 Michael Schade, 2011
 Wiener Sängerknaben, 2013
 Luca Pisaroni, 2015
 Kristian Bezuidenhout, 2019

References

External links
 Mozartgemeinde Wien website 

Austrian music awards
Wolfgang Amadeus Mozart
Awards established in 1969
1969 establishments in Austria
Clocks
Music in Vienna